1,3-Diphenylisobenzofuran is a highly reactive diene that can scavenge unstable and short-lived dienophiles in a Diels-Alder reaction. It is furthermore used as a standard reagent for the determination of singlet oxygen, even in biological systems. Cycloadditions with 1,3-diphenylisobenzofuran and subsequent oxygen cleavage provide access to a variety of polyaromatics.

Preparation 
The first synthesis of 1,3-diphenylisobenzofuran was reported in 1905 by A. Guyot and J. Catel. Phenylmagnesium bromide was reacted with 3-phenylphthalide (the latter accessible from the methyl ester of 3-hydroxyphthalide with phenylboronic acid in 95% yield) to a lactol, which gives with mineral acids upon elimination of water 1,3-diphenylisobenzofuran with 87% yield.

The patent literature describes the preparation of 1,3-diphenylisobenzofuran by [4+2]cycloaddition of 1,3-butadiene and dibenzoylethylene (1,4-diphenyl-2-butene-1,4-dione, accessible from fumaryl chloride and benzene in the presence of aluminum chloride.). Dibenzoylethylene is predominantly present in the trans configuration but it can be converted into the needed cis configuration by simple heating.

The 4,5-dibenzoylcyclohexene formed previously is cyclized with acetic anhydride to the dihydroisobenzofuran. By bromine addition and hydrogen bromide elimination, 1,2-dibenzoylbenzene is formed and recyclized with zinc acetic acid to the final product 1,3-diphenylisobenzofuran. A publication from 1940 describes high yields for the individual stages of the extensive reaction sequence.

The (much cheaper) phthaloyl chloride gives also access to 1,2-dibenzoylbenzene via Friedel-Crafts acylation with benzene, which is reduced to 1,3-diphenylisobenzofuran in 78% yield using potassium borohydride.

The synthesis of 1,3-diarylisobenzofurans from 2-acylbenzaldehydes and boronic acids is less cumbersome and gives better yields,

just like the synthesis from salicylaldehydes via phenacylhydrazones, which undergo oxidation with lead(IV) acetate to give ortho-diketones, followed by the reaction with an aryl Grignard reagent.

Properties 
1,3-Diphenylisobenzofuran is a yellow, light- and air-sensitive, crystalline solid that is soluble in many organic solvents with a maximum absorption around 420 nm (in solution), which generates intense fluorescence. Fluorescence measurements can be performed  in DMF and DMSO because of the stability of 1,3-DPBF in those solvents. In chloroform and carbon tetrachloride the dissolved 1,3-diphenylisobenzofuran is rapidly photolyzed by attack of CHCl2 and CCl3 radicals, even in the absence of oxygen. [24 ]

With ethanol, 1,3-diphenylisobenzofuran forms an orange-yellow, fluorescent solution. On  irradiation, it forms a colorless photodimer (upon with exclusion of oxygen), upon discolouration of the solution.

The compound's refractive index is 1,6700 at 25 °C and 589 nm.

Use

Reagent for determination of singlet oxygen  

In the presence of methylene blue irradiated with red laser light, 1,3-diphenylisobenzofuran reacts with intermediate singlet oxygen 1O2, forming an unstable peroxide that decomposes into (colorless) 1,2-dibenzoylbenzene. The detection of singlet oxygen by 1,3-diphenylisobenzofuran is based on this reaction, even in biological systems. For biological systems, water-soluble derivatives of 1,3-diphenylisobenzofuran were developed. The singlet oxygen generation of photosensitizers were monitored by photolysis of 1,3-diphenylisobenzofuran (DPBF). 1,2-Dibenzoylbenzene absorbs at <300 nm, therefore making DPBF an optimal chemical trap for detecting singlet oxygen, as most photosensitizers absorb <400-600 nm. This allows for an accurate determination of the photodegradation of the molecule.

Dienophile in Diels-Alder reactions  
Isobenzofurans like 1,3-diphenylisobenzofuran are among the most reactive Diels-Alder dienes known to date, and are useful for scavenging short-lived and unstable olefins and alkynes. The group led by Georg Wittig made important contributions to this topic.

With the unstable cyclohexyne, 1,3-diphenylisobenzofuran reacts to a tricyclic compound that gives a 9,10-diphenylcyclohexenonaphthalene after hydrogenation and hydrogen abstraction.

1,3-Diphenylisobenzofuran gives similarly with benzyne (dehydrobenzene) an oxygen-bridged anthracene (in 85% yield), which can be reduced with zinc to 9,10-diphenylanthracene (88% yield).

Cyclopropenone (which is unstable above its melting point of -29 °C) reacts quantitatively at room temperature with 1,3-diphenylisobenzofuran to form a Diels-Alder adduct, which is exclusively an exo isomer.

Dimethyl acetylenedicarboxylate reacts with 1,3-diphenylisobenzofuran as dienophile in 84% yield to yield the corresponding adduct.

1,3-Diphenylisobenzofuran reacts also with heterocyclic dienophiles such as 3-sulfolene to the corresponding Diels-Alder adduct.

Molecular building block for polyaromatics 
Polyaromatic hydrocarbons (PAHs) are of interest as precursors to graphite but also raise concern as ingredients of pollution. They have persistence and carcinogenicity. 1,3-diphenylisobenzofuran reacts quantitatively with acenaphthylene when heated to 160 °C to give 7,12-diphenylbenzo[k]fluoranthene.

The twice occurring Diels-Alder reaction of 1,3-diphenylisobenzofuran with p-benzoquinone yields almost quantitatively a product that can be reacted further with p-toluenesulfonic acid to give a pentacene derivative in 49% yield.

Literature

References 

Isobenzofurans